Frosty the Snowman is a 1969 American animated Christmas television special produced by Rankin/Bass Productions. It is the first television special featuring the character Frosty the Snowman. The special first aired on December 7, 1969 on the CBS television network in the United States, airing immediately after the fifth showing of A Charlie Brown Christmas; both scored high ratings. The special has aired annually for the network's Christmas and holiday season every year since.

The special was based on the Walter E. Rollins and Steve Nelson song of the same name. It featured the voices of comedians Jimmy Durante (in his final film role) as the film's narrator, Billy De Wolfe as Professor Hinkle, and Jackie Vernon as Frosty.

The special's story follows a group of school children, led by a girl named Karen, who build a snowman called Frosty and place a magician's hat on his head, which makes him come to life. Unfortunately, however after noticing the high hot temperature and fearing that he would melt, Frosty, along with Karen and a rabbit named Hocus Pocus, must go to the North Pole to be safe from melting.

Arthur Rankin Jr. and Jules Bass wanted to give the show and its characters the look of a Christmas card, so Paul Coker Jr., a greeting card and Mad magazine artist, was hired to do the character and background drawings. The animation was produced by Mushi Production in Tokyo, Japan, with Yusaku "Steve" Nakagawa and then-Mushi staffer Osamu Dezaki (who is uncredited) among the animation staff. Durante was one of the first people to record the song when it was released in 1950 (though at the time the song had slightly different lyrics); he re-recorded the song for the special.

Rankin/Bass veteran writer Romeo Muller adapted and expanded the story for television, as he had done with the "Animagic" stop-motion production of Rudolph the Red-Nosed Reindeer.

TV Guide ranked the special number 9 on its 10 Best Family Holiday Specials list.

Plot
In a schoolhouse on Christmas Eve, inept magician Professor Hinkle unsuccessfully performs his tricks during a Christmas party. Upon being dismissed, the children go outside to play in the snow and build a snowman they name "Frosty." Professor Hinkle chases his rabbit Hocus Pocus, who has absconded with his hat. The hat is blown off by the wind and caught by Karen, a student who puts it on Frosty's head and brings him to life. Professor Hinkle reclaims the hat when it gets blown off and refuses to believe that he saw Frosty come to life. Later, Hocus switches the hat with a Christmas wreath and brings it back to the children. They use the hat to revive Frosty again, and the snowman is immediately amazed by his newfound life.

When the temperature rises, Frosty fears he will melt unless he can get to the North Pole. The children suggest putting him on a train to get there and they parade through town on the way to the train station, shocking several townspeople including the traffic cop. Because they have no money for tickets, Hocus, Frosty, and Karen secretly board a northbound freight train's refrigerator car filled with ice cream and christmas cakes while Professor Hinkle follows them to reclaim the hat.

As the train continues northward, Frosty sees that Karen cannot withstand the freezing boxcar. When the train stops to let a passenger train pass, the group disembarks in search of somewhere to warm Karen, with Hinkle following in pursuit. By nightfall, Frosty and Hocus struggle to bring an unconscious Karen through the forest. Hocus asks the forest animals to build a campfire for Karen, which they succeed in doing. Fearing that the fire will not be good enough, Frosty decides to look for Santa Claus, whom they assume can save Karen and bring him to the North Pole. While Hocus searches for Santa, Professor Hinkle arrives, and Karen and Frosty flee and stumble upon a greenhouse that the latter enters to warm up Karen, only for Hinkle to arrive and lock them both inside.

Hocus leads Santa to the greenhouse, only to find Karen crying over an already melted Frosty. Santa comforts her, explaining that Frosty is made of Christmas snow and will return every winter. He then opens the door and the winter wind revives Frosty. As they are about to put the hat on his head, Hinkle demands his hat back. Santa intervenes and threatens to never bring him another Christmas present if he reclaims the hat. After Hinkle runs home to write his apologies, hoping to get a new hat for Christmas, Santa brings Frosty back to life, drops Karen off at her house, and takes Frosty to the North Pole, promising that he will return every year with the magical Christmas snow.

As the credits roll, Frosty leads a parade with the children, Hocus, the narrator (Jimmy Durante), the traffic cop, and the rest of the town, including Professor Hinkle who is now sporting his new hat. As the parade ends, Frosty boards Santa's sleigh, and they fly off to the North Pole, with Frosty altering the song's last line, saying, “I’ll be back on Christmas Day!”

Voice cast
 Jackie Vernon as Frosty
 Jimmy Durante as himself (Narrator)
 Billy De Wolfe as Professor Hinkle
 June Foray as Karen, schoolchildren, and Teacher
 Paul Frees as Traffic Cop, Ticket Man, the boys, Hocus Pocus, and Santa Claus
 Suzanne Davidson as Karen (later airings)
 Greg Thomas as children (later airings)

Production credits
 Producers/Directors: Arthur Rankin, Jr., Jules Bass
 Writer: Romeo Muller
 Based on "Frosty the Snowman" by Steve Nelson and Jack Rollins
 Character Designer: Paul Coker, Jr.
 Continuity Designer: Don Duga
 Sound Effects Engineers: Jim Harris and Phil Kaye
 Editorial Supervisor: Irwin Goldress
 Animation: Mushi Studios
 Animation Supervisor: Steve Nakagawa
 Animation Director: Osamu Dezaki (uncredited)
 Musical Director: Maury Laws

Soundtrack

Released by Rhino on October 1, 2002, the entire audio portion of Frosty the Snowman is available on CD along with the entire audio portion of Santa Claus is Comin' to Town, the Rankin/Bass special produced in 1970. This edition contains the full dialogue and song audio of both specials.

The track listing is as follows:

 Medley: Santa Claus Is Comin' To Town...Be Prepared To Pay 25:18
 Medley: Put One Foot In Front Of The Other...Santa Claus Is Comin' To Town (finale) 24:55
 Frosty The Snowman Theme & Narration (Beginning) 13:45
 Frosty The Snowman Theme & Narration (Conclusion) 11:48
 Santa Claus Is Comin' To Town (Soundtrack Version) 1:50
 Frosty The Snowman (Soundtrack Version) 1:04

Home media

VHS and LaserDisc
Family Home Entertainment released Frosty the Snowman on VHS as part of the Christmas Classics Series in 1989 and 1993, with multiple re-prints throughout the 1990s. It was paired with The Little Drummer Boy on LaserDisc in 1992. Upon its 1989 and 1993 releases, the special was also bundled in box sets with the other Rankin/Bass Christmas specials including Rudolph the Red-Nosed Reindeer and Santa Claus is Comin' to Town, the 1973 Chuck Jones holiday special, A Very Merry Cricket and the sequel Frosty Returns which aired on CBS in 1992. In 1998, Sony Wonder and Golden Books Family Entertainment released the special on VHS, and also paired it with these other Rankin/Bass Christmas specials including Cricket on the Hearth in the separate Holiday Classics Collection box sets.

DVD and Blu-ray
The special was also released on DVD by Sony Wonder and Golden Books Family Entertainment in 2001 and Classic Media in 2002 and 2004, and by Genius Entertainment in 2007. Vivendi Entertainment re-released it on DVD and for the first time on Blu-ray on October 12, 2010, and on the DVD/Blu-ray combo pack on November 6, 2012. Most DVD releases also include Frosty Returns. On September 8, 2015, Classic Media re-released both the special and Santa Claus is Comin' to Town in their 45th Anniversary Collector's Edition on Blu-ray and DVD in addition to the 50th Anniversary release of Rudolph the Red-Nosed Reindeer in 2014. Universal Pictures Home Entertainment released a Deluxe Edition of the special, along with other specials on Blu-ray and DVD, on October 16, 2018.

Sequels
Frosty returned in several sequels:

 Frosty's Winter Wonderland – This 1976 standalone sequel by Rankin/Bass was also written by Romeo Muller. Narration is provided by Andy Griffith (Jimmy Durante retired after a stroke in 1972) and Jackie Vernon reprised the role of Frosty. The animation was produced by Topcraft in Japan. Unlike the original, the sequel takes place later in the winter season and is based upon the 1934 song "Winter Wonderland." The plot follows Frosty's pursuit of a wife and the town's efforts to preserve him into the springtime. Jack Frost is introduced as the new antagonist, and no characters besides Frosty and the traffic cop return from the original. As the special takes place in the late winter, it makes no mention of Christmas (the original song likewise did not mention Christmas).
 Rudolph and Frosty's Christmas in July – This 1979 Rankin/Bass feature-length sequel was filmed in the "Animagic" stop-motion style of Rudolph the Red-Nosed Reindeer. While the Frosty special is 30 minutes long, and the Rudolph special runs 60 minutes, this film is feature-length, at 97 minutes long (120 minutes on television, including commercials). Jackie Vernon returned as the voice of Frosty for the final time. Jack Frost also makes a brief return from Frosty's Winter Wonderland. Although set during the Fourth of July, this sequel is the only one to mention Christmas, and Santa Claus plays a major role. This is also the only Frosty special not to feature a narrator.
 Frosty Returns – This 1992 half-hour special is not truly a sequel to the original since it was produced not by Rankin/Bass but by CBS, and the characters, setting, voices and animation (by Bill Melendez) have all changed. Frosty's physical appearance, personality, and humor are markedly different, and he has the ability to live without his top hat, in direct contrast with the Rankin/Bass specials. Despite this, it was included as a bonus on previous DVD releases. John Goodman provides the voice of Frosty in this special, and Jonathan Winters serves as narrator. The special avoids all mention of Christmas and has an environmentalist theme, as Frosty works to stop a corporate executive whose spray product wipes out snow.
 The Legend of Frosty the Snowman – This 2005 straight-to-video film was produced by Classic Media, the previous rights holder for the original Rankin/Bass special, and the remainder of their pre-1974 library. This movie has been bundled with the original 1969 Rankin/Bass special and the CBS sequel and aired on Cartoon Network. The story features almost entirely new characters and there are some inconsistencies in continuity, though Frosty's appearance closely resembles the Rankin/Bass character design. Professor Hinkle also appears in a flashback cameo role, and is later revealed to be the grandfather of the main character, who as an adult is the narrator (voiced by Burt Reynolds). Frosty is voiced by Bill Fagerbakke, best known as the voice of Patrick Star on SpongeBob SquarePants.

See also
 List of Christmas films
 List of Rankin/Bass Productions films

Notes

References

External links

 Holiday Central at CBS.com
 

1960s American animated films
1960s American television specials
1960s animated short films
1960s fantasy films
1969 comedy films
1960s supernatural films
1969 animated films
1969 films
1969 in American television
1969 television specials
American animated television films
American children's animated fantasy films
American fantasy comedy films
American supernatural comedy films
1960s animated television specials
CBS television specials
Christmas television specials
Films about magic and magicians
Films based on songs
Television shows directed by Jules Bass
Films directed by Arthur Rankin Jr.
Films scored by Maury Laws
Frosty the Snowman television specials
Rankin/Bass Productions television specials
Santa Claus in film
Santa Claus in television
Supernatural fantasy films
Television shows written by Romeo Muller
American Christmas television specials
Animated Christmas television specials